Valery Baranov may refer to:

Valery Baranov (politician) (born 1957), Ukrainian politician
Valery Baranov (soldier) (born 1948), Russian soldier